The Ranvet Stakes is an Australian Turf Club Group 1 Weight for Age Thoroughbred horse race for three-year-olds and older over a distance of 2,000 metres, held at Rosehill Gardens Racecourse in Sydney, Australia in March. Total prize money is A$1,000,000.

History
The original name of the race was named after Sir Harry Holdsworth Rawson, who was Governor of New South Wales from 27 May 1902 to 27 May 1909.

Since 1991 the event has been named after the sponsor Ranvet, a supplier of equine nutrition, supplements and veterinary medications.

Name
 1903–1987 - Rawson Stakes
 1988–1990 - Segenhoe Stakes
 1991 onwards - Ranvet Stakes

Distance
 1903–1954 -  miles (~1800 metres)
 1955 -  miles (~2000 metres)
 1956–1962 -  miles (~1800 metres)
 1963–1972 -  furlongs (~1500 metres)
 1973–1978 – 1750 metres
 1979–2007 – 2000 metres
 2008 – 1900 metres (held at Canterbury)
 2009–2016 – 2000 metres

Grade
 1903–1979 - Principal race
 1980 onwards - Group 1

Gallery of noted winners

Winners

 2022 - Montefilia
2021 - Verry Elleegant
2020 - Addeybb
2019 - Avilius
2018 - Gailo Chop
2017 - Our Ivanhowe
2016 - The United States
2015 - Contributer
2014 - Silent Achiever
2013 - Foreteller
2012 - Manighar
2011 - Zavite
2010 - Theseo
2009 - Theseo
2008 - Tuesday Joy
2007 - Desert War
2006 - Eremein
2005 - Grand Armee
2004 - Sound Action
2003 - Rebublic Lass
2002 - Universal Prince
2001 - Tie the Knot
2000 - Tie the Knot
1999 - Darazari
1998 - Gold Guru
1997 - Arkady
1996 - Electronic
1995 - Stony Bay
1994 - Dark Ksar
1993 - Veandercross
1992 - My Eagle Eye
1991 - Super Impose
1990 - Better Loosen Up
1989 - Beau Zam
1988 - Beau Zam
1987 - Myocard
1986 - Late Show
1985 - Alibhai
1984 - Mr. McGinty
1983 - Dalmacia
1982 - Allez Bijou
1981 - Hyperno
1980 - Minuetto
1979 - Marceau
1978 - Marceau
1977 - Purple Patch
1976 - Balmerino
1975 - Passetreul
1974 - Bankrupt
1973 - Gunsynd
1972 - Regal Rhythm
1971 - Gunsynd
1970 - Broker's Tip
1969 - Foresight
1968 - Regal Rhythm
1967 - Striking Force
1966 - Even Better
1965 - Time And Tide
1964 - Wenona Girl
1963 - Sky High
1962 - Sky High
1961 - Wenona Girl
1960 - Bardshah
1959 - Bold Pilot
1958 - Tulloch
1957 - Redcraze
1956 - Arlunya
1955 - Prince Morvi
1954 - Gallant Archer
1953 - Tarien
1952 - Forest Beau
1951 - Grey Boots
1950 - Dickens
1949 - Vagabond
1948 - Columnist
1947 - Columnist
1946 - Bernborough
1945 - Veiled Threat
1944 - Falcon Knight
1943 - Katanga
1942 - race not held
1941 - Beau Vite
1940 - Dashing Cavalier
1939 - Spear Chief
1938 - Sarcherie
1937 - Lough Neagh
1936 - Lough Neagh
1935 - Peter Pan
1934 - Rogilla
1933 - Lough Neagh
1932 - Ammon Ra
1931 - Waterline
1930 - Nightmarch
1929 - Winalot
1928 - Limerick
1927 - Limerick
1926 - Valicare
1925 - The Hawk
1924 - Whittier
1923 - Furious
1922 - Beauford
1921 - †Richmond Main / Poitrel
1920 - Artilleryman
1919 - Wolaroi
1918 - Westcourt
1917 - Giru
1916 - Cetigne
1915 - Cisco
1914 - Popinjay
1913 - race not held
1912 - Malt King
1911 - Malt King
1910 - Bobrikoff
1909 - Maltine
1908 - Poseidon
1907 - Garches
1906 - Marvel Loch
1905 - Ibex
1904 - Air Motor
1903 - Great Scot

† Dead heat

See also
List of Australian Group races
Group races

References

External links
First three placegetters Ranvet Stakes (ATC)

Group 1 stakes races in Australia
Open middle distance horse races
Recurring sporting events established in 1903
1903 establishments in Australia